Quincy House is one of twelve undergraduate residential Houses at Harvard University, located on Plympton Street between Harvard Yard and the Charles River. The second largest of the twelve undergraduate houses, Quincy House was named after Josiah Quincy III (1772–1864), president of Harvard from 1829 to 1845. Quincy House's official counterpart at Yale University is Branford College.

House colors are red, gold, white, and black, and the House's seal in those colors is emblazoned on a wall of the dining hall wing facing the House's main courtyard. In 2005, Quincy House adopted the penguin as its official mascot. Its residents, nicknamed "penguins" after the mascot, live in the house during their sophomore through senior years.

History
Officially opened in September 1959, Quincy House symbolized the "new" Harvard. As a part of the Edward Harkness bequest, it was the first House to be built after construction of the original seven river Houses. Three buildings currently house Quincy House students: Old Quincy, New Quincy, and 20 DeWolfe Street.

The older of the sections of Quincy House, "Old Quincy", underwent extensive renovations during the 2012–13 academic year, and opened in the fall of 2013 as Stone Hall. It had originally been named for early Harvard president Increase Mather and was part of Harvard's Leverett House until 1960. Constructed in 1929–30 during Abbott Lawrence Lowell's university presidency, its neo-Georgian exterior has been retained, but its finely detailed suites, high ceilings, carved moldings, and fireplaces have given way to modern suites, corridors that invite interaction between suite residents, and sunlit common rooms. Until the construction of New Quincy in the late 1950s necessitated their removal, the now open east side was enclosed by a one-story range of squash courts.

Designed by the Boston firm of Shepley, Bulfinch, Richardson, and Abbott, New Quincy is a modern eight-story high-rise with views of its more traditional neighbors. It consists of a two-story commons wing along Mt. Auburn Street, a nine-story main residence unit with split level suites having splendid views, and the raised, glass-walled House Library, nicknamed "the Qube", the placement of which adds a second interior court to the series of courtyards and gardens that are a distinctive part of the House.

The 20 DeWolfe Street residence hall is a brick structure with a double mansard roof of lead-coated copper. The 10 and 20 DeWolfe Street residences are overflow housing that have at various times housed freshmen, students from Leverett House, Dunster House, and Kirkland House.

House traditions
Traditionally at the beginning of each academic year, the Quincy House Masters and Senior Tutor gather with a bagpiper to conduct the Exorcism of the spirit of Josiah Quincy, parading in the courtyard after the exorcism speech is recited. Quincy House also hosts a field day in which second, third, and fourth year students compete against each other in athletic contests.  The "Quincy Assassins" is an annual event in which students target a fellow house member with a Nerf gun.  Another recently implemented tradition of the House is its annual lip-sync battle.

On the day each spring when freshmen learn of their House affiliations for their upperclass years, Quincy House students storm the yard with their house flag, led by someone wearing a penguin suit.

There had been a tradition in the 1970s for a regular dinner in one of the small rooms off the main dining hall (which were often used for meals organized by campus or house organizations), where cannabis was smoked by the attendees; by the end, or even the middle, of dinner a haze would usually settle over the room. This continued at least into spring term 1980 but was phased out not long after that. The regular event was called "The Space Table" and fliers advertising it included the Star Trek slogan "To Boldly Go Where No Man Has Gone Before."

House life
The current Quincy House faculty deans are Eric Beerbohm and Leslie Duhaylongsod. Beerbohm is a Professor of Government in Harvard's Faculty of Arts and Sciences and Duhaylongsod is a professor in the Secondary and Higher Education department at Salem State University. House events are coordinated by the Quincy House Committee, or HoCo. The committee operates separately from the Harvard Undergraduate Council (UC) to organize student events and manage funding.

The Quincy Grille is a student-run diner that is popular among students of all Harvard dormitories. The grill is open seven days a week and serves a standard board of grill fare such as mozzarella sticks, fries, and chicken fingers but additionally serves signature items such as the Lee and Nerden burgers (named after former Faculty Dean Lee Gehrke and Building Manager Dick Nerden, respectively) as well as Too Much Swag (a combination of cheese-covered popcorn chicken and curly fries) and Quinception (a quesadilla with chicken and mozzarella sticks).  Quincy House's library is called "the Qube", a reference to its shape and glass walls.  The Qube has one of the best comic book collections at Harvard.  The House's dining hall is unrestricted except to first-year students and on Thursday night for Community Dinner.  Large glass walls surround the dining hall, allowing natural light to enter and affording views of the House courtyards, Mt. Auburn Street, and even sunsets sometimes.  The dining hall's interior is also unique, as it has a "ski lodge" feel and a large abstract mural occupies its entire back wall.  Quincy's Junior Common Room, decorated with mid-century modern period furniture, is a popular location for doing homework and having informal and formal gatherings, but only Quincy students have swipe access.  The House lobby features pool and ping-pong tables that promote House socializing. The House also contains a pottery studio, dance studio, and gym.

Quincy House is sometimes called "The People's House" because it seems to belong to everyone at Harvard; its central location and few restrictions enable undergraduates from all Houses and student organizations to meet there freely.

Pronunciation

Notable alumni
Notable Quincy alumni include New York Times columnist Ross Douthat, former U.S. Solicitor General Seth P. Waxman, former Tennessee Governor Phil Bredesen, director Rob Cohen, Assemblyman Nelson Denis, journalist Lou Dobbs, former Under Secretary of Defense for Policy Douglas Feith, Jamie Gorelick, first Secretary of Homeland Security Tom Ridge, Ron Kind, Peter Sagal, Suzanne Malveaux, Anthony Brown, Zappos CEO Tony Hsieh, Commerce Secretary and former Governor of Rhode Island Gina Raimondo, ESPN sportswriter Pablo S. Torre, Robert Kirshner, Joe Sanberg, musician Dean Wareham and Judge Lucy H. Koh. Massachusetts Congressman Seth Moulton and Merrick Garland, former Chief Judge of the U.S. Court of Appeals for the D.C. Circuit and current Attorney General of the United States, were affiliated tutors at Quincy House as graduate students.

References

External links
Photographic views of Quincy House, 1957-1970s, Harvard University Archives

Quincy House official site

Harvard Houses
1959 establishments in Massachusetts
School buildings completed in 1959